Debojyoti Mishra (born 30 April  1963 at Kolkata) is an Indian music director and film composer. He became popular with his minimalist classical compositions for the Hindi film Raincoat, directed by Rituparno Ghosh. He also worked on Bengali films,  Chaturanga and Sesher Kobita, directed by Suman Mukhopadhyay. He composed songs for the Bengali film Autograph starring Prasenjit Chatterjee, Nandana Sen and Indraneil Sengupta.

Early years and Career

He had composed for Shakira in  a British production being directed by Enamul Karim.

Filmography

References

Indian film score composers
Living people
1960 births
University of Calcutta alumni
Jingle composers
People from Dinajpur District, Bangladesh
Musicians from Kolkata
Bengali musicians
Indian male film score composers